The 2014 Belgian Cup Final, named Cofidis Cup after the sponsor, was the 59th Belgian Cup final and took place on 22 March 2014 between Lokeren and Zulte Waregem. It was won by Lokeren with the only goal coming from Alexander Scholz. For Lokeren it was their second cup win in three years.

Route to the final

Match

Summary
Zulte Waregem had the best opportunities in a closed first half. Both Idrissa Sylla and Mbaye Leye saw their shot hit the post, while Lokeren only had one decent chance, the header of Nill De Pauw going wide.

In the second half, the goal by Jens Naessens was correctly disallowed for offside. With just under an hour played, Alexander Scholz headed the ball into the top corner of the goal, which would remain the only goal of the game as Zulte Waregem did not manage to break through the Lokeren defence in the last half-hour, even though they saw most of the ball.

Details

External links
  

Belgian Cup finals
Cup
K.S.C. Lokeren Oost-Vlaanderen matches
S.V. Zulte Waregem matches
Sports competitions in Brussels
2014 in Brussels
March 2014 sports events in Europe